In mathematics, a function is locally bounded if it is bounded around every point. A family of functions is locally bounded if for any point in their domain all the functions are bounded around that point and by the same number.

Locally bounded function

A real-valued or complex-valued function  defined on some topological space  is called a  if for any  there exists a neighborhood  of  such that  is a bounded set. That is, for some number  one has

The converse is not true in general (see below).

This definition can be extended to the case when  takes values in some metric space  Then the inequality above needs to be replaced with

where  is some point in the metric space. The choice of  does not affect the definition; choosing a different  will at most increase the constant  for which this inequality is true.

Examples 

However, it  locally bounded because for each   in the neighborhood  where 

In any neighborhood of 0 this function takes values of arbitrarily large magnitude.

 Any continuous function is locally bounded. Here is a proof for functions of a real variable.

 The converse of the above result is not true however; that is, a discontinuous function may be locally bounded.

Locally bounded family 

 
for all  and  In other words, all the functions in the family must be locally bounded, and around each point they need to be bounded by the same constant.

This definition can also be extended to the case when the functions in the family U  take values in some metric space, by again replacing the absolute value with the distance function.

Examples 

 The family of functions   where  is locally bounded. Indeed, if  is a real number, one can choose the neighborhood  to be the interval  Then for all  in this interval and for all  one has  with  Moreover, the family is uniformly bounded, because neither the neighborhood  nor the constant  depend on the index 

 The family of functions   is locally bounded, if  is greater than zero. For any  one can choose the neighborhood  to be  itself. Then we have  with  Note that the value of  does not depend on the choice of x0 or its neighborhood  This family is then not only locally bounded, it is also uniformly bounded.

 The family of functions   is  locally bounded. Indeed, for any  the values  cannot be bounded as  tends toward infinity.

Topological vector spaces

Local boundedness may also refer to a property of topological vector spaces, or of functions from a topological space into a topological vector space (TVS).

Locally bounded topological vector spaces

A subset  of a topological vector space  is call is bounded if for each neighborhood  of the origin in  there exists a real number  such that

A  is a topological vector space that posses a bounded neighborhood of the origin. 
By the Kolmogorov's normability criterion, this is true of a locally convex space if and only if the topology of the TVS is induced by some seminorm. 
In particular, every locally bounded TVS is locally convex and pseudometrizable.

Locally bounded functions

Let  a function between topological vector spaces is said to be a locally bounded function if every point of  has a neighborhood whose image under  is bounded.

The following theorem relates local boundedness of functions with the local boundedness of topological vector spaces:

Theorem. A topological vector space  is locally bounded if and only if the identity map  is locally bounded.

See also

External links
 PlanetMath entry for Locally Bounded
 nLab entry for Locally Bounded Category

Theory of continuous functions
Functional analysis
Mathematical analysis